Fremont Bridge may refer to:

 Fremont Bridge (Portland, Oregon)
 Fremont Bridge (Seattle)